Warren County Technical School (WCTS) is a technical and vocational public high school located in Washington, which serves students in ninth through twelfth grades as well as adult learners from across Warren County, United States, as part of the Warren County Technical School District. The school has been accredited by the Middle States Association of Colleges and Schools Commission on Elementary and Secondary Schools since 1996.

As of the 2021–22 school year, the school had an enrollment of 440 students and 36.8 classroom teachers (on an FTE basis), for a student–teacher ratio of 12.0:1. There were 71 students (16.1% of enrollment) eligible for free lunch and 16 (3.6% of students) eligible for reduced-cost lunch.

In addition to students in its full-time high school programs, the school also serves 150 adult students in the fields of Licensed Practical Nursing, Cosmetology, HVAC, Welding, and Black Seal Certification.

History
The current campus, located on New Jersey Route 57, opened in 1969. There were 500 students during the 2013-2014 school year.

Awards, recognition and rankings
Schooldigger.com ranked the school tied for 190th out of 381 public high schools statewide in its 2011 rankings (an increase of 72 positions from the 2010 ranking) which were based on the combined percentage of students classified as proficient or above proficient on the two components of the High School Proficiency Assessment (HSPA), mathematics (75.5%) and language arts literacy (96.1%).

Facilities and programs
Warren County Technical School completed construction of a  addition that included the creation of a theater for the use of the school's performing arts program. The total cost was $6.7 million.

High school programs
 Electrical Applications
 Law and Public Safety
 Television, Radio, and Digital Media
 Health Sciences
 Engineering
 Automotive Technology
 Cosmetology
 Carpentry and General Construction
 Hospitality and Culinary Arts
 Welding
 Child Development
 Fire Science (offered in conjunction with the Law and Public Safety career track)
 Computer Programming (opened during the 2017–2018 school year)

Athletics
The Warren Tech Knights compete in 12 interscholastic athletic programs:

Fall: Boys and Girls Cross Country, Boys and Girls Soccer, 
Winter: Boys and Girls Basketball, Boys and Girls Bowling, Cheerleading
Spring: Baseball, Softball

References

External links
Warren County Technical School

Data for Warren County Technical School, National Center for Education Statistics

Washington, New Jersey
1959 establishments in New Jersey
Educational institutions established in 1959
Middle States Commission on Secondary Schools
Public high schools in Warren County, New Jersey
Vocational schools in New Jersey